Gopavaram is a village in Kadapa district of the Indian state of Andhra Pradesh. It is located in Gopavaram mandal of Badvel revenue division.

Education
The primary and secondary school education is imparted by government, aided and private schools, under the School Education Department of the state. The medium of instruction followed by different schools are English, Telugu.

See also 
List of census towns in Andhra Pradesh

References 

Census towns in Andhra Pradesh